Ali Saneei Arani (born 28 June 1973) is an Iranian professional futsal coach and former player. He is currently head coach of Iran national under-20 futsal team. He was the head coach of Iran national futsal team from 2011 to 2012. During his term as the head coach Iran did not perform well, resulting in the loss of Asian title in 2012, an early exit from the Futsal World Cup 2012 held in Thailand, and a drop in the world ranking from 4th place to 7th. He was sacked in Nov. 2012 just after the World Cup.

Honours

Country 
 AFC Futsal Championship
 Champion (5): 1999 – 2000 – 2001 – 2002 – 2003

Club 
 Iranian Futsal Super League
 Champion (1): 2002–03 (Pas)
 Runner-Up (2): 2000–01 (Hesa) – 2001–02 (Pas)
 Tehran Football Competitions
 Champion (1): 1999–2000 (Atashneshani)

Managerial 
 WAFF Futsal Championship
 Champion (1): 2012
 AFC U-20 Futsal Championship
 Champion (1): 2017

References

External links
 Ali Saneei On Instagram

1973 births
Living people
People from Isfahan Province
Iranian men's futsal players
Futsal defenders
Iranian futsal coaches
Iran national futsal team managers